USS Santee (CVE-29) (originally launched as AO-29, then  ACV-29) was an American escort carrier. The second ship with this name, it was launched on 4 March 1939 as Esso Seakay under a Maritime Commission contract (MC hull 3) by the Sun Shipbuilding and Dry Dock Company at Chester, Pennsylvania, sponsored by Mrs. Charles Kurz. It was acquired by the United States Navy on 18 October 1940 and commissioned on 30 October 1940 as AO-29.

Prior to her acquisition by the Navy, Esso Seakay had been operated by Standard Oil of New Jersey (Esso) on the west coast. During her commercial service, she set several records for fast oil hauling. Her original model was a type T3-S2-A1 tanker.

World War II
After commissioning, Santee served in the Atlantic. When American neutrality ended on 7 December 1941, Santee was carrying oil for a secret airdrome at NS Argentia, Newfoundland. In the spring of 1942, Santees conversion to an aircraft carrier was begun at the Norfolk Navy Yard.

1942
On 24 August 1942, Santee was commissioned as an escort carrier with designation ACV-29, with Commander William Sample in command. The ACV was fitted with such haste that workmen from Norfolk were still on board during her shakedown training and her decks were piled high with stores. After conversion, nominally completed on 8 September, Santee reported to Task Force 22 (TF 22) and the first plane landed on her flight deck on 24 September.

After shakedown, Santee departed Bermuda on 25 October and headed for the coast of Africa. While the escort carrier was en route on 30 October, an SBD Dauntless being launched from a catapult dropped a  depth bomb onto the flight deck. It rolled off the deck and detonated close to the port bow shaking the entire ship, carrying away the rangefinder and a searchlight base, and damaging radar antennas.

Nevertheless, Santee continued steaming with Task Group 34.2 (TG 34.2). Santee launched planes and fueled ships until 13 November, when she rejoined TG 34.2 and returned to Bermuda. The group departed that island on 22 November and anchored in Hampton Roads, Virginia two days later.

1943
After voyage repairs and drydock, Santee got underway with destroyer , on 26 December. On 1 January 1943, Santee anchored at Port of Spain, Trinidad. After disembarking passengers at Recife, she sailed to join Task Unit 23.1.6 (TU 23.1.6) at sea in tightening the noose on enemy merchant shipping and naval activity in the South Atlantic.

For a month, her planes flew anti-submarine missions and regular patrols. On 15 February, the escort carrier put in at Recife, remaining until 21 February. Back conducting routine sorties in the same manner, Santee operated from 21 February – 2 March when she again put into Recife.

Her next period at sea, which began on 4 March, brought action. On 10 March, light cruiser  and destroyer Eberle were investigating a cargo liner which had been spotted by Santees aircraft and which had been tentatively identified as the Karin, a Dutch merchantman. It turned out to be the German blockade runner Kota Nopan (ex-Dutch Kota Pinang). As the Eberle boarding party drew alongside, explosives placed by the abandoning crew detonated, killing eight boarders. On 15 March, Santee set out for Norfolk and anchored at Hampton Roads on 28 March.

Four days later, the escort carrier departed the harbor with a convoy of homeward-bound empties. No submarines were sighted, but one of her Avengers made a forced landing in Spain, and its crew was interned. Santees small task group left the convoy on 12 July with orders to operate independently against Nazi submarine concentrations south of the Azores. She remained at this anti-submarine work until 25 July and managed to attack seven surfaced U-boats, at the price of two Dauntlesses.

On the 25th, she joined a west-bound convoy, which reached the Virginia coast on 6 August.

Santee made another convoy run from Bermuda to Casablanca and back to Hampton Roads from 29 August – 13 October. On 25 October, the escort carrier departed the east coast for Casablanca, reaching Basin Delpit on 13 November. Standing out of Casablanca the next day, she rendezvoused on 17 November with battleship , carrying President Franklin D. Roosevelt. After providing air cover for the battleship and her escorts for several days, Santee was ordered to the Bay of Biscay, where she engaged in anti-submarine work until the end of November.

As TG 21.11, Santee and a trio of four-stackers patrolled the North Atlantic from 1–9 December. The group was dissolved upon arrival at the Norfolk Navy Yard on 10 December, and Santee, minus her aircraft, stood out of Norfolk on 21 December, and headed for New York in company with battleship , and several destroyers. From 22 to 28 December, the escort carrier packed her hangar and flight decks with P-38 Lightning fighter planes at Staten Island. Getting underway in convoy on 29 December, she steamed unchallenged across the North Atlantic, reaching Glasgow on 9 January 1944.

1944
Emptied of her P-38 cargo, Santee departed Glasgow in convoy on 13 January and returned to Norfolk on 24 January. She stood out of Norfolk on 13 February with destroyer escort , transited the Panama Canal on 18–19 February and moored at San Diego, California, on 28 February. There, she embarked 300 Navy and Marine Corps personnel and 31 aircraft for delivery to Pearl Harbor. She also took on 24 Grumman F4F Wildcats and Grumman TBF Avengers as her own air group.
Standing out of San Diego Bay on 2 March, Santee unloaded her ferried aircraft and personnel at Pearl Harbor upon her arrival on 9 March.

Designated Carrier Division 22 (CarDiv 22), they joined the fast carriers of the United States Fifth Fleet on 27 March and sped west to the Palaus. There, their planes of CarDiv 22 flew patrols over vulnerable tankers before setting course for Espiritu Santo in the New Hebrides on 4 April.

In this, the closing phase of the New Guinea campaign, Santee fueled and provisioned near Espiritu Santo from 7–10 April; then sailed to Purvis Bay, Solomons on 13 April. CarDiv 22 joined CarDiv 24 and a destroyer squadron on 16 April and set course for New Guinea.

Santees air group aircraft aided in destroying 100 enemy aircraft and ripping up enemy airfields before the landings, prior to departing for Manus Island, Admiralties, on 24 April. Arriving at Seeadler Harbor the next day, she and her sister ships took on fuel and food; then sailed again on 26 April for Hollandia (currently known as Jayapura). From 12 May – 1 June, she traded in her own air arm for 66 F4U Corsairs and 15 F6F Hellcats and personnel of Marine Air Group 21 (MAG 21). On 2 June, CarDiv 22 started north for Kwajalein Atoll in the Marshalls. On 4 August, Santee reached newly won Guam. The 81 aircraft of MAG 21 became the first planes to operate from the reconquered island.

After training exercises and the re-embarkment of her own planes at Manus, Santee got underway on 10 September and rendezvoused with TF 77 near Mapia Island. At Morotai in the Moluccas, her Avengers bombed ground installations. One plane was lost to the enemy, but Santee herself had no contact with the Japanese. By 1 October, she was back in Seeadler Harbor.

Sailing from Manus on 12 October, Santee and accompanying combatants reached Philippine waters on 20 October. Her gunners shot down an enemy plane during an air attack that morning, and her aircraft splashed two more.

At 07:40, a kamikaze – carrying what was estimated to be a  bomb – crashed through the flight deck and damaged the hangar deck. At 07:56, a torpedo fired from a Japanese submarine struck the ship, causing flooding of several compartments and creating a 6° list. Emergency repairs were completed by 09:35.

Between 18 and 27 October, Santee planes shot down 31 Japanese planes and sank one  ammunition ship, in addition to damage inflicted by strafing during their 377 sorties. On 31 October, she anchored in Seeadler Harbor for temporary repairs.

Underway again on 9 November, she moored at Pearl Harbor on 19 November. Following more repairs, she embarked 98 Marines for transportation to the U.S. and entered Los Angeles Harbor on 5 December. Santee completed the year undergoing repairs to battle damage and general overhaul.

1945
After post repair trials at San Diego, the escort carrier headed toward Hawaii on 31 January 1945, and arrived at Pearl Harbor on 8 February. On 7 March, she got underway for Ulithi in the Western Carolines, altering her course en route to assist in the search for the B-24 Liberator which had disappeared while carrying Army Lieutenant General Millard F. Harmon, before anchoring on 19 March. Two days later Santee steamed toward Leyte Gulf.

On 27 March, Santee departed the Philippines to provide air coverage for southern transport groups Dog and Easy en route to the objective area at Okinawa Gunto for the invasion of Okinawa Jima, the largest combined operation of the Pacific war.

On Easter Sunday, 1 April 1945, Santee provided direct support to the American ground forces landing on Okinawa and she continued this duty until 8 April, when she turned to aid British carriers in denying the use of Sakishima Gunto airfields to the enemy. For 42 consecutive dawns, Santees aircraft winged over target sectors in the East China Sea, with daily returns to Okinawa itself for routine ground support. On 16 June, Santee launched a fighter bomber mission against specified targets on Kyūshū, Japan.

Pulling out of the Okinawa area that day, Santee reached Leyte Gulf on 19 June, where minor repairs were made. Out again on 1 July, she operated west of Okinawa from 5–14 July, covering minesweeping operations. On 7 July, a tail hook broke on a landing aircraft, allowing it to clear all barriers, crash among parked planes, and cause a fire. Four fighters and two torpedo bombers were jettisoned, six torpedo bombers were rendered non-flyable duds, and one of the pilots of the parked aircraft was killed.

Santee was detached from the task unit on 15 July and proceeded to Guam, arriving at Apra Harbor four days later. Following flight deck repairs and general upkeep, the escort carrier got underway on 5 August for Saipan, engaging in carrier aircraft training for squadrons flown from that island en route. Anchoring in Saipan Harbor on 9 August, the CVE got underway for the Philippines on 13 August. Santee received word of the cessation of the hostilities against Japan on 15 August and anchored in San Pedro Bay, Leyte, two days later.

On 4 September, while en route to Korea to support occupation forces there, Santee was ordered to northern Formosa to evacuate ex-prisoners of war. On 5 September, the escort carrier received 155 officers and men of the British and Indian Armies from destroyer escort . These soldiers had been captured by the Japanese in Malaya in 1942. They were given medical aid and berthed on the hangar deck. They included 30 American Army and Navy officers and men who had been taken on Bataan and Corregidor, and 10 officers and men from the Dutch Army and Merchant Marine, captured in Java. On 9 September, Santee disembarked the 477 evacuees at Manila Bay.

Five days later, Santee stood out of Manila Bay and steamed for Okinawa, anchoring at Buckner Bay on 19 September. Underway again the next day, Santee reached Wakanoura Wan, Honshū, Japan, on 22 September. From 24 to 26 September, Santee steamed along the coast, providing air coverage for occupation forces landing at Wakayama.

Post-war
Santee departed Wakanoura Wan on 3 October, leaving her formation on 6 October to search for a missing PBM Mariner flying boat carrying Rear Admiral William D. Sample, the ship's first commanding officer after her conversion to an escort carrier.

On 20 October, Santee got underway for Okinawa, arriving two days later at Buckner Bay. On 23 October, Santee got underway for Pearl Harbor, disembarking 375 passengers there on 4 November. The next day, Santee continued her role in "Operation Magic Carpet" by embarking 18 Marines bound for the west coast.

Anchoring at San Diego on 11 November, Santee remained there until 26 November, when she got underway for Guam on additional "Magic Carpet" duty.

On 27 February 1946, Santee departed San Diego and arrived at Boston Harbor on 25 March, via the Panama Canal. The CVE was placed in reserve on 21 October. Santee was reclassified on 12 June 1955 as an escort helicopter aircraft carrier, CVHE-29, and struck from the Naval Vessel Register on 1 March 1959. On 5 December, she was sold to the Master Metals Company for scrap.

Awards
Santee received nine battle stars and the Presidential Unit Citation for her World War II service.

References

Sources

External links
 navsource.org: USS Santee
 hazegray.org: USS Santee
 t2tanker.org

Type T3-S2-A tankers
1939 ships
Merchant ships of the United States
Cimarron-class oilers (1939)
Ships built by the Sun Shipbuilding & Drydock Company
World War II auxiliary ships of the United States
World War II tankers of the United States
Sangamon-class escort carriers
World War II escort aircraft carriers of the United States